Campion Anglo-Indian Higher Secondary School was started in the year 1934 at Tiruchirapalli, Tamil Nadu, India. The school is named after its patron saint, St. Edmund Campion. The principal is Rev. Bro. James Paulraj.

History
The school was founded in 1934 as a subdivision school to St. Joseph’s European Middle School, which is now St Joseph's Girls Anglo Indian School. The school owes its existence to the philanthropy of a priest, Mgr. Joseph De Rozario, an Anglo-Indian, who was once a district sessions judge. It was intended for Europeans and Anglo-Indians, but members of other communities are also admitted. The school was initially administered by the Jesuits.

To mark the 25th anniversary of its foundation in 1960, the school constructed a chapel, dedicated to Regina Mundi, the "Queen of the World". In 1970, the school celebrated the canonization, on 25 October 1970, of Edmund Campion, the patron of the school.

At the close of 1972, the Jesuits handed over the management of the school to the owners, the Diocese of Tiruchirapalli. From 1975, the management of the school was taken over from the Diocese by the Brothers of Christian Instruction of St. Gabriel, also known as the Gabrielite Brothers.

With the coming of the Montfort Brothers the school witnessed changes and developments of a far-reaching nature. One important development was the upgrading of the school to the higher secondary level. The higher secondary section started in June 1979. A swimming pool and two concrete basketball courts were added to the infrastructure of the school as Diamond Jubilee Memorials in 1994-95.

Student life and facilities
Campion is in the heart of the city on Bharadhidhasan Salai, Cantonment. A student of Campion is called a Campionite.

The school has a mini-zoo, swimming pool and a skating ground. The hostel can accommodate 200 students. There is a mess in the hostel building for the hostelers.

There is a chapel on campus, accommodating 300 people. Mass is conducted every first Friday of every month for students and teachers of Campion. The chapel is open to the public on Sunday and mass is conducted in the morning and evening.

Academics
There are laboratories for physics, chemistry, computer and biology. The main computer lab has around 50 systems and the primary block computer lab has 31 systems. There is an audio-visual room with 150-seat capacity where seminars are conducted.

Brother Antony Hall in the hostel building is a 500-seat hall where elocution competitions, fancy dress competitions, dramas and other indoor events take place. Two assembly stages, one in the main block and another in the primary block are present. A canteen is midway between the skating ground and swimming pool.

The Centenary Memorial Building was constructed in 2006, connecting the primary block with the main block. A library is in the main block.
The school has a Communication Skills laboratory and a recording studio.

Athletics
The school has a swimming pool, built in 1996. There is a small pool where primary school students (from LKG to 5th grade) learn swimming and the depth is 2 feet. The depth of the big pool ranges from 4 feet to 9.5 feet. There is a changing room with toilets and bathrooms in the pool premises. In April and May, swimming courses are conducted that are open to the public. District level and state level swimming competitions are held in Campion.

There are four basketball courts, and one of them is indoors. There is a football ground where cricket and hockey are also played. Athletic events and sports day celebrations are conducted in the same ground. An indoor badminton and table tennis courts are in the hostel building. A skating ground is adjacent to the school canteen. There is a sports complex which has a mini gym. A grand pavilion is adjacent to the sports complex where all important functions such as "Campofez," a sports day and school day take place.

Emblem 
The patron, St. Edmund Campion, was hanged and the circular rope signifies his martyrdom. The cross inside the circle symbolises sacrifice. The initials of the school — CHS — stand for Cur Hic Statis. The letters DS in the centre is an abbreviation of the motto of the Monfort Brothers  — Dieu Seul  — means God alone. The school motto cur hic statis means 'why stand ye here?'

COBA
The school has an Old Boys Association COBA (Campion Old Boys Association). The association brings into union and friendship, all former students of Campion Anglo Indian Higher Secondary School, Trichy and fosters and perpetuate their interest and connection with their "Alma Mater".

Notable alumni
 Girish Mathrubootham, Founder and CEO, Freshdesk
 M. Damodaran, former director of Indian Institute of Management Tiruchirappalli and former chairman of Securities and Exchange Board of India
 Major Mariappan Saravanan, late military officer who died during Kargil War
 Leslie Fernandez, Indian Hockey Player 
 Sivakarthikeyan, Tamil film actor
 Vishnu Vishal, Tamil film actor
 Nalan Kumarasamy, film director
 Balaji Mohan, Tamil Film director
 Vijay Antony, Music Director and Actor
 Anand Babu, film actor
 Gajesh, film actor
 Rajagopal Sathish, Indian cricketer, MI/KKR  IPL Player
 Sridhar, Film Producer, Tamil industry 
 Krish (singer), singer, actor, Tamil industry
 Pradeep Milroy, Head of Programming - Star Vijay Television Pvt Ltd

References

External links
 

Brothers of Christian Instruction of St Gabriel schools
Catholic secondary schools in India
Catholic boarding schools in India
Boys' schools in India
Private schools in Tamil Nadu
Christian schools in Tamil Nadu
Primary schools in Tamil Nadu
High schools and secondary schools in Tamil Nadu
Schools in Tiruchirappalli
Educational institutions established in 1934
1934 establishments in India